RTÉ Radio 1 is an Irish national radio station owned and operated by RTÉ and is the direct descendant of Dublin radio station 2RN, which began broadcasting on a regular basis on 1 January 1926.

The total budget for the station in 2010 was €18.4 million. It is the most-listened-to radio station in Ireland.

History
The Department of Posts and Telegraphs opened 2RN, the first Irish radio station, on 1 January 1926. Station 6CK, a Cork relay of 2RN, joined the Dublin station in 1927, and a high-power transmitter at Athlone in County Westmeath opened in 1932. From the latter date the three stations became known as Radio Athlone, later being renamed Radio Éireann ("Irish Radio"/"Radio of Ireland") in 1937. 

Like most small European broadcasters at that time Radio Éireann had only been assigned a single high-power frequency (meaning only one channel could be broadcast), and had limited programming hours due to financial constraints. Until after the Second World War Radio Éireann was only able to afford to broadcast in the evenings with the exception of a programme of records in the afternoon. It broadcast a mixed schedule of light entertainment and serious drama, Irish language programming, and talks. Radio Éireann also carried sponsored programmes, often produced by Leonard Plugge's International Broadcasting Company, which tended to be more popular than programming made directly by Radio Éireann itself.

Operated as part of the civil service until 1960, the Broadcasting Authority Act 1960 transferred the station to a statutory corporation, also called Radio Éireann, in preparation for the launch of its sister television station. The name of the corporation was changed to Radio Telefís Éireann in 1966. As a consequence, the station was renamed RTÉ Radio. The station also began FM transmission in 1966. In 1971 the station began the phased move from the GPO on O'Connell Street in Dublin city centre, to a new purpose-built Radio Centre at Donnybrook. When, in 1979, RTÉ established a new rock and pop station under the name of RTÉ Radio 2 (now RTÉ 2fm), the original RTÉ Radio station was renamed RTÉ Radio 1.

In 1973, The Gay Byrne Hour began, becoming The Gay Byrne Show in 1979. This anchored the station's daily morning schedule until 1998. On 3 November 1984, current affairs programmes Morning Ireland and Today at Five began broadcasting. The former is now the flagship programme of RTÉ News and Current Affairs on radio while the latter has evolved into the current Drivetime programme via Five Seven Live.

Reception
RTÉ Radio 1 is available in Ireland on 88-90 MHz FM and 252 kHz longwave (LW). The LW version of Radio 1, which can also be received across the United Kingdom and parts of Western Europe, is also the only RTÉ Radio service available in parts of Northern Ireland since the closure of mediumwave.

DAB broadcasts of the station began in the east of the country (from the Clermont Carn and Three Rock Mountain high power transmitters via the RTÉ DAB Multiplex) on 1 January 2006. RTÉ DAB is available on the Saorview platform. Listeners to WRN's English Service for Europe and English Service for North America can also hear a selection of RTÉ Radio 1 programmes. RTÉ Radio 1 has been carried on shortwave in DRM during specific events, including the All Ireland finals. RTÉ carried out DRM tests on its longwave frequency 252 kHz.

The station's tuning signal since 1936 has been the air O'Donnell Abú, although since the advent of 24-hour broadcasting in 1997, the tune has been played only as a prelude to the start of the day's live broadcasting at 5:30 on weekday mornings.

The station broadcasts weekdays from 05:30 - 03:00 and weekends from 06:00 - 02:00. During the station's overnight downtime, Radio 1 simulcasts the output of the digital "classic hits" channel RTÉ Gold.

Longwave 252
The LW version of Radio 1, which commenced in 2004, which can also be received across the United Kingdom and parts of Western Europe – and is transmitted on the 252 kHz frequency formerly used by the Atlantic 252 radio station – differs in certain respects from that broadcast on FM, particularly at the weekend, with significant additional sports coverage and religious programming. The LW service was due to be withdrawn on Monday 27 October 2014 on cost grounds. However, RTÉ subsequently announced that it had postponed the closure until 19 January 2015 "in order to ensure that listeners, particularly in the UK, have sufficient time to understand and avail themselves of alternatives". As a result of further public pressure, especially from elderly Irish listeners in Britain, churches, the GAA, emigrant groups, and listeners in Northern Ireland who wouldn't all have access to RTÉ on FM or DAB, it was announced in December 2014 that the 252 frequency would be kept on the air until at least 2017, and in March 2017 that transmission on longwave would continue until June 2019. Transmission of RTÉ Radio 1 resumed on 252 longwave in October 2019.

RTÉ currently operates 252 longwave at a markedly lower power level than its ITU licensed 500 kilowatts: 
in the daytime it radiates at 150 kW and at night 60 kW. This reduction in power means that interference from the French-language station Alger Chaîne 3 – broadcasting on the same frequency from Tipaza with a daytime power of 1,500 kW and 750 kW at night – is considerable, and particularly affects reception of RTÉ Radio 1 on longwave on the south coast of Ireland after dark.

Closure of medium-wave frequencies
The medium-wave transmitters of RTÉ Radio 1 were shut down at 15.00 on 24 March 2008. The main transmitter was based at Tullamore and broadcast on 567 kHz. A lower–powered relay in Cork at 729 kHz was also in service. Before 1975, the main transmitter was based at Athlone using the same frequency. AM transmissions continue on longwave 252 kHz from Summerhill, Co. Meath, it is aimed to serve Irish people living in Britain and uses the old Atlantic 252 transmitter. In 2007 a new telefunken tram 300 kW transmitter was installed which is capable of DRM (Digital Radio Mondiale) broadcasts which can transmit up to seven services in near FM quality, but consumer receivers are not being manufactured. The power can be remotely regulated on this transistor-based transmitter. The two original 1989 transmitters were made by continental electronics each 300 kW and were tube based. Because there's only one 300 kW transmitter now the maximum possible power is 300 kW even though the site is licensed for 500 kW 24hrs. Since the closure, Second Helpings programmes at the weekend have been limited to digital broadcasts only.
Most complaints about the closure of mediumwave were from groups such as fishermen and the elderly, also from people who did not have the longwave band on their radios.

Part of the rationale behind closing medium wave and using long wave to access listeners in hard-to-reach parts of Ireland and the UK, was that reception would be better in places such as the south of England and London areas which in the past had very poor coverage from RTÉ on mediumwave.

Satellite
The FM service is also available online and from the Astra 2E satellite at 28.2° East on transponder 7 (11.914 GHz horizontal, symbol rate 27500, FEC 5/6, service ID 5544), Freesat channel 750, Sky channel 0160 and Virgin Media channel 917.

References

External links
RTÉ Radio 1 — Official Website

 
1926 establishments in Ireland
Radio stations established in 1926
Longwave radio stations